John McCaul (March 7, 1807 – April 16, 1887) was an Irish-born Canadian educator, theologian, and the second president of the University of Toronto from 1848 to 1853.

McCaul was born in Dublin, Ireland and earned Bachelor of Arts, Master of Arts and Doctor of Laws degrees from Trinity College, Dublin. He served as a Church of Ireland clergyman before moving to Toronto, Upper Canada in 1839 to become the principal of Upper Canada College. He resigned from the position in 1842 to serve as vice-president of King's College and professor of logic, rhetoric, and classics. In 1849, King's College was renamed as the University of Toronto, and McCaul was elected to succeed John Strachan as president. McCaul served until 1853, when he became the head of University College, a constituent college of the University of Toronto.

During the Trent Affair of 1862, William Mulock asked John McCaul as the head of the college to call a student meeting that led to the formation of the University Company of volunteers, later K Company of the Queen's Own Rifles.

McCaul was also a dedicated musician and was president of the Toronto Philharmonic Society from 1845 to 1847.

He was elected a member of the American Antiquarian Society in 1846.

McCaul Street in downtown Toronto takes its name from John McCaul, as did McCaul's Pond, a pond that formerly existed near today's Hart House (University of Toronto) fed by waters of Taddle Creek.

References

External links
 
 

1807 births
1887 deaths
Canadian Anglican priests
Canadian Anglican theologians
Irish Anglican theologians
Church of Ireland priests
Christian clergy from Dublin (city)
Pre-Confederation Ontario people
Presidents of the University of Toronto
Members of the American Antiquarian Society